Wayne Brown may refer to:
 Wayne Brown (ice hockey) (1930–2019), Canadian ice hockey player
 Wayne Brown (American politician) (1936–2013), American politician and accountant
 Wayne Brown (author) (1944–2009), writer born in Trinidad and Tobago
 Wayne Brown (New Zealand politician) (born 1946), mayor of Auckland, health leader and businessman
 Wayne Brown (footballer, born January 1977), English football goalkeeper
 Wayne Brown (footballer, born August 1977), English football defender
 Wayne Brown (footballer, born 1988), English footballer